

L
 LA   - Louisiana and Arkansas Railway, Kansas City Southern Railway
 LACX - Goodyear Tire and Rubber Company
 LAFX - LafargeHolcim
 LAHX - Calrail Company, Transportation Equipment, Inc.
 LAJ  - Los Angeles Junction Railway
 LAKX - City of Lakeland
 LAL  - Livonia, Avon and Lakeville Railroad
 LAMX - Lamco, Inc.
 LANO - Penn Eastern Rail Lines, Inc.
 LANU - CATU Containers, SA
 LAPT - Los Angeles Union Passenger Terminal
 LAPX - General American Transportation Corporation
 LARU - Lanan, Inc.
 LASB - Lackawaxen and Stourbridge Railroad
 LBFX - L.B. Foster Company
 LBR  - Lowville and Beaver River Railroad
 LBWX - Pulaski Development Company, Technical Propellants, Inc.
 LC   - Lancaster and Chester Railway
 LCCE - Lee County Central Electric
 LCCX - Liquid Carbonic Corporation
 LCEX - Lone Star Industries, Inc.
 LCGX - Continental Grain Company, Cargill, Inc.
 LCHX - LCP Transportation, Inc.
 LCIX - Liquid Carbonic Corporation, Praxair, Inc.
 LCLX - Ledcor Communications, Ltd.
 LCOX - L A Colo and Sons, Inc.
 LCPX - LCP Transportation, Inc., General American Marks Company
 LCR  - Lake County Railroad
 LCRC - Lenawee County Railroad
 LCRR - Lincoln Central Railroad; Lorraine, Eastern and Pacific Railroad; Lincoln Pacific Railway
 LCRX - Lower Colorado River Authority
 LCSX - Laclede Steel Company
 LCWX - LCP Chemicals-West Virginia, Inc.
 LDAX - Louisiana Agricultural Finance Authority
 LDCX - Louis Dreyfus Corporation
 LDRR - Louisiana and Delta Railroad
 LDRT - Lake Front Dock and Railroad Terminal Company
 LDSX - Lambton Diesel Specialists, Inc.
 LDTC - Lawndale Transportation Company
 LE   - Louisiana Eastern Railroad
 LECX - Leco Corporation
 LEE  - Lake Erie and Eastern Railroad
 LEF  - Lake Erie, Franklin and Clarion Railroad
 LEFX - Greenville Leasing Company
 LEHX - Lehigh Cement Company
 LEN  - Lake Erie and Northern Railway
 LEOX - Golden Foods, Inc.
 LEP  - Lorraine, Eastern and Pacific Railroad; Lincoln Pacific Railway
 LER  - Logansport and Eel River Short-Line Company
 LERX - PSI Energy, Inc.
 LEVX - Level Energy, Inc.
 LEWU - Norman Lewis Tankers, BV
 LEYX - Wanda Petroleum Company
 LFAX - L.F. Anderson
 LFCD - Linea Coahuila Durango, SA de CV
 LFFZ - Burlington Northern and Santa Fe Railway; BNSF Railway
 LFPX - Lane Forest Products, Inc.
 LGAX - Lockheed-Georgia Company
 LGCX - La Prairie Group Contractors (Alberta), Ltd.
 LGEU - CATU Containers, SA
 LGEX - L.G. Everist, Inc.
 LGIX - Lincoln Grain, Inc.
 LGMX - Logistics Management Systems
 LGNZ - Burlington Northern and Santa Fe Railway; BNSF Railway
 LGSX - MidAmerican Energy Company
 LGTU - Liquid and Gas Transport, Inc.
 LGTX - Logistechs, Inc.
 LHFX - Lehigh Heavy Forge Corporation
 LHR  - Lehigh and Hudson River Railway; Norfolk Southern
 LHRR - Longhorn Railroad
 LHTX - Larsen Farms
 LI   - Long Island Rail Road
 LIBU - Lib Leasing
 LICU - Intermodal Container Service Ltd.
 LIMU - UTS Bernhardt Verhuizingen BV
 LIMX - Chemical Lime Company
 LINC - Lewis and Clark Railway
 LINU - Linde AG Geschaftsbereich
 LINX - GE Railcar Services Corporation
 LIRC - Louisville and Indiana Railroad
 LIRR - Lapeer Industrial Railroad
 LIRU - Roland Ltd.
 LISU - Lithuanian Shipping Company Ltd.
 LITU - Union Resources Ltd.
 LITX - Lite Industries, Inc.
 LIXU - Crosstrade Shipping Ltd.
 LKRR - Little Kanawha River Rail
 LKWR - Lackland Western Railroad
 LL   - Poplar River Mine Railroad
 LLCX - LLCX, Inc.
 LLIX - LUC Leasing, Inc., Services Unlimited
 LLKX - Needham Transportation Company
 LLLX - Louisiana Leasing Limited Of Illinois
 LLPX - Locomotive Leasing Partners
 LM   - Litchfield and Madison Railway, Chicago and North Western Railway, Union Pacific Railroad
 LMCU - World Container Leasing, Inc.
 LMCX - All Minerals Corporation
 LMIC - Lake Michigan and Indiana Railroad
 LMIX - LORAM Maintenance of Way, Inc.
 LMSX - Locomotive Management Services
 LMT  - Louisiana Midland Transport
 LMTX - LMT Associates, Chartrand's Tank Car Service, Inc.
 LMWX - Railway Marketing Corporation, MHC, Inc. (subsidiary of ConAgra)
 LN   - Louisville and Nashville Railroad, Seaboard System Railroad, CSX Transportation
 LNAC - Louisville, New Albany and Corydon Railroad
 LNAL - Louisville, New Albany and Corydon Railroad
 LNE  - Lehigh and New England Railroad, Norfolk Southern
 LNO  - Laona and Northern Railway
 LNTX - Alliant Energy
 LNVT - Landisville Terminal and Transfer Company
 LNW  - Louisiana and North West Railroad
 LNWX - Locomotives Northwest, Ltd.
 LOAM - Louisiana Midland Railway
 LOCX - Mobile Locomotive Services, Inc.
 LOGU - Societe-Logemafer
 LOGX - Linden Leasing, Inc.
 LORU - Renzlor Securities Corporation
 LOSX - Locomotive Specialists, Inc.
 LOVX - American Colloid Company
 LOWU - Management Control and Maintenance, SA
 LOWX - Tosco Corporation
 LP - Lincoln Pacific Railway
 LPGX - Universal LPGX Company
 LPIU - Leasing Partners International, B.V.
 LPN  - Longview, Portland and Northern Railway
 LPRR - Lincoln Pacific Railway
 LPRU - Losinjska Plovidba Mali Losing
 LPSG - Live Oak, Perry and South Georgia Railway
 LRAX - Latinoamerican Railroad Association, Inc.
 LRCX - Livingston Rebuild Center, Inc.
 LRDX - MidAmerican Energy Company
 LRIX - Lake Superior Eastern Rail Industries
 LRLX - Evans Railcar Leasing Company, GE Rail Services Corporation
 LRMX - Logistics Resource Management
 LRPA - Little Rock Port Railroad
 LRS  - Laurinburg and Southern Railroad
 LRWN - Little Rock and Western Railroad
 LRWY - Lackawanna Railway
 LS   - Luzerne Susquehanna Railway
 LSBC - La Salle and Bureau County Railroad
 LSBZ - Chicago Rail Link
 LSCX - D-H Investors (Relam Auditing Services)
 LSEU - One Way Lease, Inc.
 LSFZ - Burlington Northern and Santa Fe Railway; BNSF Railway
 LSI  - Lake Superior and Ishpeming Railroad
 LSIU - L.S. Intertank
 LSIX - Liquid Sugars, Inc., ADM Transportation
 LSMX - Progress Rail Services Corporation
 LSO  - Louisiana Southern Railway
 LSRC - Lake State Railway
 LSRR - Lone Star Railroad
 LSRX - Lake Superior Railroad Museum
 LSTT - Lake Superior Terminal and Transfer Railway
 LT   - Lake Terminal Railroad
 LTC  - Lafferty Transportation
 LTCR - Leelanau Transit Company
 LTCX - Union Carbide Corporation, Praxair, Inc.
 LTEX - L.H.A.G.S., Inc. (Larry's Truck and Electric Service)
 LTIU - Lloyd Triestine Di Navigazione, S.P.A.
 LTLZ - Burlington Northern and Santa Fe Railway; BNSF Railway
 LTTX - Trailer Train Company, TTX Company
 LTVX - LTV Steel Company
 LUBX - Philip Metals, Inc.
 LUCX - Railroad Car Management Company, Inc., Services Unlimited
 LUN  - Ludington and Northern Railway
 LUNX - GE Rail Services Corporation
 LUSX - LUSCAR, Ltd.
 LUUX - Lux International Corporation
 LUX  - Tosco Corporation
 LV   - Lehigh Valley Railroad; Norfolk Southern
 LVAL - Lackawanna Valley Railroad
 LVRC - Lamoille Valley Railroad
 LVRR - Lycoming Valley Railroad
 LW   - Louisville and Wadley Railway
 LWAX - Laidlaw Environmental Services
 LWIX - L and W Entertainment Company, Inc. (Milk and Cookies Railroad)
 LWR  - Lakeland and Waterways Railway
 LWV  - Conrail; Norfolk Southern
 LXOH - Lexington and Ohio Railroad
 LXVR - Luxapalila Valley Railroad
 LYKU - Lykes Brothers Steamship Company
 LYKZ - Lykes Brothers Steamship Company 
 LYNX - Round Butte Products
 L&PS - London and Port Stanley Railway

L